Dayton Brenna Wetherby McArthur (born 5 September 1994) is a US-born Panamanian footballer who plays as a goalkeeper. She has been a member of the Panama women's national team.

Early life
Wetherby was born to an American father from California, Jeffrey Wetherby, and a Panamanian mother, Dawn McArthur. She was raised in Wesley Chapel, Florida.

International career
Wetherby capped for Panama at senior level during the 2013 Central American Games.

See also
 List of Panama women's international footballers

References

1994 births
Living people
People with acquired Panamanian citizenship
Panamanian women's footballers
Women's association football goalkeepers
Panama women's international footballers
Panamanian people of American descent
People from Wesley Chapel, Florida
Sportspeople from the Tampa Bay area
Soccer players from Florida
American women's soccer players
Navy Midshipmen women's soccer players
American sportspeople of Panamanian descent
United States Marines